Todd Robinson may refer to:

 Todd Robinson (ice hockey) (born 1978), Canadian professional ice hockey player
 Todd Robinson (film director), American film writer, director, and producer
 Todd D. Robinson (born ), American diplomat
 Todd W. Robinson (born 1967), American lawyer and jurist